The Chesterfield House is an Antebellum house at 9625 Old Rutledge Pike in the Mascot community of northeastern Knox County, Tennessee.  Built in 1838 by George W. Arnold, a physician from Roanoke, Virginia, the house is now listed on the National Register of Historic Places.  It was located along a stagecoach route (roughly what is now US 11) that began in Washington, D.C., passed through Knoxville, and continued further south. Stagecoaches made stops at Chesterfield.

The mansion is a two-story brick structure with a one-story covered front porch.  The porch has a balcony above, accessed off a second floor room.  Architecturally, the house has Georgian influences.  It remains a private residence, and is not open to the public.

References
 Knoxville: Fifty Landmarks. (Knoxville: The Knoxville Heritage Committee of the Junior League of Knoxville, 1976), page 24.

External links
 National Register of Historic Places
 Knox County Historic Preservation

Houses in Knox County, Tennessee
Houses on the National Register of Historic Places in Tennessee
National Register of Historic Places in Knox County, Tennessee